Georgios Barkoglou (born 8 July 1978) is a Greek former professional footballer who played as a midfielder.

External links
 Guardian Football

1978 births
Living people
Panetolikos F.C. players
Aris Thessaloniki F.C. players
A.P.O. Akratitos Ano Liosia players
Egaleo F.C. players
Xanthi F.C. players
Apollon Pontou FC players
Panionios F.C. players
Levadiakos F.C. players
A.O. Kerkyra players
Apollon Smyrnis F.C. players
Super League Greece players
A.O. Nea Ionia F.C. players
Association football midfielders
Panelefsiniakos F.C. players
Footballers from Athens
Greek footballers